Frederick Shick (February 5, 1914 – August 9, 1992) was an American sailor. He competed in the 8 Metre event at the 1936 Summer Olympics.

References

External links
 

1914 births
1992 deaths
American male sailors (sport)
Olympic sailors of the United States
Sailors at the 1936 Summer Olympics – 8 Metre
Sportspeople from Bethlehem, Pennsylvania